"Lovebug Itch" is a country music song written by Jenny Lou Carson and Roy Botkin, sung by Eddy Arnold, and released on the RCA Victor label. In September 1950, it reached No. 2 on the country charts. It spent 16 weeks on the charts and was the No. 10 best selling country record of 1950.

See also
 Billboard Top Country & Western Records of 1950

References

Eddy Arnold songs
1950 songs